Banu 'Amilah, also spelled Amelah, were an Arab tribe that inhabited the historic region of Jabal Amel in present day Southern Lebanon. Lebanese Shia Muslims of Southern Lebanon hail the tribe as their progenitors, and uphold them in high esteem for adopting and nurturing Shia Islam in the region.

According to tradition, they were originally a South Arabian tribe migrating from the towns of Bardoun, Yarim, Mayrayama and Jibla in the central highlands and the Raimah region in Yemen after Marib Dam flood in 200 BC.
In traditional genealogy, they trace their genealogy back to 'Amilah whose real name is "al-Harith son of 'Afirah son of 'Udi son of Murrah son of 'Add son of Zayd son of Yashgub son of Zayd son of Kahlan. Accordingly, they initially dwelt in Jordan and Syria, eventually settling the southern highlands and eastern valley of modern Lebanon. Irfan Shahîd contrasts the traditional view, saying that it is almost certain that the tribe formed a part of Nabataean confederacy along with Judham and Balqayn, and that their presence in the region goes back to Biblical times.
Others have traced the tribe's origin back to Quda'a or even the Biblical Amalekites.

Byzantine era
From their then-settlement in southern Palestine (which they still occupied even during the Muslim conquest of the Levant), for centuries Banu  'Amilah acted as foederati for the Byzantines against any possible threats from the tribes of the Arabian peninsula and the Persian-allied Lakhmids. They are believed to have settled in the area, possibly in the 3rd or 4th century, after moving from Iraq and through Palmyra. They were noted for their strong commitment to the Empire in the 6th century and acknowledged Ghassanid supremacy among the Arab foederati. They were closely linked with the neighbouring Banu Judham and allied to Banu Kalb.

While little is known of their religious beliefs, they have been described as superficial followers of Monophysitism and were named Mutanasira (Christians who did not have firm belief in Christianity), as opposed to Nasara (Christians). Some even mention the tribe keeping some pagan practices. However, much later sources have described them as devoted Christians.

Islamic era
Prior to the Islamic era, Banu 'Amilah were nominally Christian, in accordance with the surrounding inhabitants of the land. Despite having left Arabia centuries earlier and having intermarried with locals to a limited extent, they still retained a strong sense of their Arab origins and identity even leading up to and after the Muslim Arab conquests of the Levant from 634 to 638. However, the spectacular success of their ethnic kinsmen under the Caliphate inculcated in the tribe a sense of envy and threatening encroachment upon the independence of their settlements and absorption into the wider Arab sphere. As a result, the tribe sought as much as possible to isolate themselves and preserve their unique status from Caliphate authority. This desire especially intensified and acquired a newfound urgency with the establishment in 661 of the Umayyad Caliphate capital in nearby Damascus, Syria. As a result of this anti-establishment stance and the later neglect of the Levant under the Sunni Abbasids and Tulunids, the tribe (along with other, especially rural, residents around the Lebanon) was particularly open to alternate theologies espoused by Shia movements that occasionally rose up and threatened the Umayyads and later Caliphates. This affinity to the Shia cause was strengthened following the captivity in nearby Damascus of the remaining family of Husayn ibn Ali, the grandson of the Islamic prophet Muhammad, following the Battle of Karbala.

In the centuries following the Islamic conquest of their homeland, Banu 'Amilah's identity as a Shia community, often described as then being proto-Shia, solidified. However, their affiliation with the Twelver Shia theology was only solidified after an influx of migrant settlements in Lebanon in the 11th to 13th centuries, of Twelver Shia especially from eastern Arabia and southern Iraq. Prior to that, the Levant had been relatively receptive to the Ismaili theology – which for a time based its activities from Syria, as well as various Ghulat groups such as the Qarmatians, which ruled over the Beqaa Valley starting in the 9th century.

Banu 'Amilah's Shia identity would lead to their marginalization and concurrent persecution under successive Sunni regimes, up to and including the Ottoman Empire, following the defeat of the Crusaders from the Levant. This was also the fate of other non-Sunni groups of the region, such as Alawites and Druze. As a result, Banu 'Amilah were forced to disperse throughout Lebanon from their traditional settlements to escape persecution.

Medieval history
Jabal Amel was attacked upon the arrival of the First Crusade in 1096–1099. Many villages and pockets successively fell in Crusader hands, but they only managed to capture Tebnine in 1106 and Tyre by 1124. The villages were not subject to such mishandling since their inhabitants remained in them, and the Crusaders needed the local population to make use of the land in order to provide them with food and procurements.

The Banu 'Amilah helped liberate their land form the Crusaders during the Ayubids and the Mamlukes era, when the last city, Tyre, was regained on May 19, 1291 AD. The Mamlukes seized power afterward and persecuted those who opposed them, or belonged to a different religious sect than theirs (Mamlukes were Sunni Muslims).

Many areas that had Banu 'Amilah residing in them lived through a number of upheavals and civil unrests, such as those surrounding Tripoli and the region of Kisrawan in Mount Lebanon.  As a result, many of them fled to the south, into areas such as Jezzine, or the east, into the Bekaa Valley.  One of their prominent clergymen during that time, Shamseddine was persecuted and eventually killed by the Mamluks in 1384 A.D., later to be named the 'First Martyr.'

They played an important role in the history of ancient and modern Lebanon. During the Ottoman rule (ca. 1517–1918), they established autonomy in their areas to the extent of having their own flag (tricoloured: red-symbol of Imam Hussein's martyrdom; black-symbol of their mourning of Hussein, and; green-the symbolic colour of Islam) and army, which fought against the Ottoman regional rulers in northern Palestine and Damascus.

Under the French Mandate

When the French took their mandate from the League of Nations after World War I, Lebanon became part of that mandate, which established modern day Republic of Lebanon in 1920 by including south Lebanon, the Bekaa Valley, and north Lebanon to form the country.

Banu Amel in the South Lebanon Governorate resented the French rule on their territory, especially the establishment of French government offices and military bases, considering it an encroachment on their historical autonomy.  Guerrilla war ensued, leading many people and prominent resistance figures to ally themselves with the Druze of Lebanon and neighbouring Syria around the Houran region along the Golan Heights area.

Adham Khanjar, one of the most historical figures during this conflict found a close alliance with Sultan Basha Al-Atrash who offered help and sometimes refuge for Khanjar and his followers. The great revolt of 1925 - 1927 succeeded in driving French forces from the Jabal Druze and became a symbol of Syrian and Lebanese common objections to the mandate and all that it represented.

Also, many religious figures played an important role in deciding the fate of this revolt against the French.  The Ulema-religious scholars-advocated and worked for cooperation between Lebanon and Syria, since they were opposed to the Greater Lebanon idea under direct French control, which was believed to be carved out of Bilad al-Sham, or Grand Syria.  Some scholars, such as Sayyed Abdul Hussain Sharaffedine issued a Fatwa for Jihad against the French.  The Ulema and the leaders in the South met in 'Wadi El Hujay' on the 24 of April 1920 to authorize Sayyed Sharafeddine, Sayyed Muhsen Al Amine and Sayyed Abdel Hussain Nureddin to discuss the future of Jabal Amel and its people with King Faisal in Damascus.

Many revolts broke out as a result beginning from the 1920s until the French departure, and a number of brigades were formed by Banu 'Amilah to fight against the French. These were led by Adham Khanjar, Sadeq Hamzeh and Muhammad Ahmad Bazzi brigades.  One of the most important events in the course of this revolt occurred in 1936 when the town of Bint-Jbeil carried a great fight against the French, which later was described as a struggle for the sake of independence. People who were killed in that event were considered martyrs of the Lebanese resistance to the French occupation.

See also
Shia Islam in Lebanon
Jabal Amel

References

Arabs in the Roman Empire
Ethnic groups in Lebanon
Yemeni tribes
Shia communities
South Arabia